Eddie Murphy is the self-titled debut solo album by Eddie Murphy. It was released in late 1982, on Columbia Records. It was certified as a Gold record and received a Grammy award nomination. The album  drew ire from the gay community, Asian-American groups and Women's groups for some of the humor.

In terms of material, the release draws upon Murphy's work on the program Saturday Night Live. The recording took place from April 30, 1982 to May 1, 1982, capturing some of Murphy's routines at the New York City venue The Comic Strip. In addition to the comedy tracks, the album contained several songs, including the parody hip-hop song "Boogie in Your Butt", which became a minor hit on the R&B charts.

Critical reception
Reviewing the album for AllMusic, critic Bret Adams wrote, "Despite Murphy's gifts, his first standup comedy album, 1982's Eddie Murphy, is uneven despite containing some classic routines."

Track listing
All tracks by Eddie Murphy, except where noted.

"Faggots" – 2:08
"Buckwheat" – 1:57
"Black Movie Theaters" – 2:33
"Talking Cars" – 0:59
"Doo-Doo/Christmas Gifts" – 6:44
"Myths/A Little Chinese" – 7:59
"Boogie in Your Butt" (Murphy, Wolfert) – 4:11
"Drinking Fathers" – 4:05
"Effrom" – 1:58
"The Pope and Ronald Reagan" – 4:39
"Hit by a Car" – 6:50
"Enough Is Enough" (Jabara, Roberts) – 4:17

Production
Produced by Eddie Murphy, Robert Wachs and David Wolfert
Recorded and engineered by Jack Malken
Mastered by Jack Adelman and Paul Brizzi
Remastering: Kevin Boutote

References

1982 debut albums
Columbia Records live albums
1980s comedy albums
Eddie Murphy albums
Live comedy albums
Spoken word albums by American artists
Live spoken word albums
Stand-up comedy albums